Cherry is an unincorporated community in Lauderdale County, Tennessee, United States. It is located at the intersection of Tennessee State Route 87 and Tennessee State Route 371. Cherry is composed of some churches, a few small businesses, homes, and farms.

Notes

Unincorporated communities in Lauderdale County, Tennessee
Unincorporated communities in Tennessee